Kerrang!/XFM UK Acoustic Sessions is the third EP by rock quartet Coheed and Cambria and it was released exclusively for iTunes music store. All tracks were recorded live and acoustic at the UK XFM studio. For some unknown duration of time, the album was removed from the iTunes Store, it has since become available again with the exception of track 2 as a partial album.

Track listing
 "Welcome Home" – 5:28
 "A Favor House Atlantic" – 4:34
 "Wake Up" – 3:52
 "The Willing Well IV: The Final Cut" (with extended solos) – 8:48

Personnel
Claudio Sanchez: Lead vocals, Rhythm/Lead guitar
Travis Stever: Lead/Rhythm guitar, backing vocals
Michael Todd: bass guitar, backing vocals
Josh Eppard: drums, backing vocals

Coheed and Cambria albums
2006 EPs
Live EPs
2006 live albums
Columbia Records live albums
Columbia Records EPs